Sir James Baird, 2nd Baronet, of Saughtonhall (c. 1658 – 1715) was a baronet.

Life 
The son of Sir Robert Baird, 1st Baronet of Saughtonhall, and Elizabeth Fleming, he became baronet in 1697 on the death of his father, in 1712 entailing the lands of Saughtonhall. The strathspey "Sir James Baird" is believed to be named in his honour.

Marriages 
Children by his first marriage, to Margaret Hamilton, include Sir David, Sir William and Sir Robert, in turn the third, fourth and fifth baronets.

Children by his second marriage to Elizabeth Gibson include Patrick Baird who in 1740–44 as a lieutenant on the ship Gloucester took place in a circumnavigation of the world as a part of George Anson's voyage around the world.

References
 thepeerage.com
 The Fiddler’s Companion

Baronets in the Baronetage of Nova Scotia
1650s births
1715 deaths